Viacheslav Vladimirovich Zhigalin (born 27 February 1950) is a former ice dancer who competed for the Soviet Union. With partner Tatiana Voitiuk, he is the 1970 European bronze medalist and 1972 Soviet national champion. With partner Lidia Karavaeva he won the bronze medal at the 1975 Prize of Moscow News.

Results

With Voitiuk

With Karavaeva

References 

Soviet male ice dancers
1950 births
Living people